Rinos Mautsa is a Zimbabwean entrepreneur notable for his role in pioneering the first ever call centre development organisation in Zimbabwe. He is the founder of Contact Centre Association of Zimbabwe and co-founder of the Chartered Institute of Customer Management.

Early life background

Rinos was born in Harare on 29 October 1984.

Career background

Rinos is the founder of the first call centre and software development company in Zimbabwe, Africcs Pvt Ltd which is also now in other Southern African countries. Rinos Mautsa also established the Contact Centre Association of Zimbabwe which is now the sole association of customer services and call centres in Zimbabwe with over 100 corporates as members.

Rinos is a founding member and chairman of Zimbabwe Youth Housing Cooperative Association which now have over 5000 members in five provinces and is working with various government departments to build low cost housing units for youths in Zimbabwe.

He is also a In 2014 he established the Chartered Institute of Customer Management which is offering professional qualification globally with channel partners in over 30 countries.

Rinos is a holder of a Marketing Management Degree Midlands State University, Masters in Business Administration Midlands State University. Leadership Certificate Oxford University among other qualifications.

Leadership positions
Despite being founder of Contact Centre Association of Zimbabwe, Zimbabwe Youth Housing Cooperative Association and Chartered Institute of Customer Management, Rinos is involved in several established businesses in various capacities:

Founder and Chairman of Facelift Construction, Energy Plus International and Tech24 Pvt Ltd.
Proctor and Associates board chairperson
World Economic Forum’s Global Shapers Curator. As curator of the Harare Hub Rinos managed to organise the first townhall to be attended by the president of Zimbabwe Cde Emmerson Mnangagwa duped “Road to Davos where he met the Zimbabwean youth
Founding Trustee of Campus Community Foundation which have presence in 6 African countries (January 2015 to date). 
He is part of the mentors for the Queen Elizabeth Young Leaders programme-UK.
Zimbabwe Youth Council  Vice Chairperson (Jan 2015 to 2017).  The council is a government youth apex board which governs the affairs of young people in Zimbabwe.
Internal Control Institute board member (January 2016 to date).
Project chairperson of Government National Call Centre (Zimbabwe)
United Nations Association of Young Professionals based in USA board member

Rinos has been a judge for

Service Excellence Awards (2009-2012)
Buy Zimbabwe Awards in 2014 and 2015
Retailers Awards for 2016
Harare Metro Corporate Social Responsibility Awards hosted by the Provincial Minister of Harare Metro in Zimbabwe.

Awards & honours
2017 Crans Montana leader of tomorrow – Crans Montana Forum – Switzerland 
2016 Desmond Tutu Fellow – African Leadership Institute (AFLI) – UK
2014 Young Visionaries Fellow Winner – Indian Government – India
2015 Leadership Award of the Year – Megafest Awards - Zimbabwe
Young Manager of The Year (Zimbabwe Institute of Management)
2015 JCI Outstanding Young Persons – Junior Chamber International 
ICT Young Achiever runner up (2012)- Ministry of ICT Zimbabwe
Industry Champion Award (Call Centre Industry) (Global Association of Contact Centers-USA)

Accusations by Government

In 2015 he was accused of working with MDC-T party to topple the Zimbabwean government.

Further read
Customer Service Conference
Youth Workshop
Service Excellence Awards

References

1984 births
Zimbabwean businesspeople
Living people
People from Harare